The 2018 Can-Am Duels were a pair of Monster Energy NASCAR Cup Series stock car races held on February 15, 2018, at Daytona International Speedway in Daytona Beach, Florida. Both contested over 60 laps, they were the qualifying races for the 2018 Daytona 500, and also counted as the first stage of the race, although no playoff points were awarded, the top ten in each race earn championship points as is normal in a stage.

Report

Background

Daytona International Speedway is one of six superspeedways to hold NASCAR races, the others being Michigan International Speedway, Auto Club Speedway, Indianapolis Motor Speedway, Pocono Raceway and Talladega Superspeedway. The track's turns are banked at 31 degrees, while the front stretch, the location of the finish line, is banked at 18 degrees.

Qualifying

Qualifying results

Duels

Duel 1

Duel 1 results

Duel 2

Duel 2 results

Media

Television

Radio

References

Can-Am Duels
Can-Am Duels
Can-Am Duels
NASCAR races at Daytona International Speedway